William Stubbs (1825–1901) was an English historian and Bishop of Oxford.

William Stubbs may also refer to:

 William Stubbs (Canadian politician) (1847–1926), member of the Canadian House of Commons
 William Stubbs (interior designer), American interior designer, host of PBS show A Moment of Luxury
 William Stubbs (trade unionist) (died 1914), English trade union leader
 Sir William Stubbs (educator), educator and former Rector of the University of the Arts, London
 William L. Stubbs (1917–2003), American Republican Party politician
 William Pierce Stubbs (1842–1909), marine painter in Boston, Massachusetts
William Stubbs (English MP) for Yarmouth (Isle of Wight) (UK Parliament constituency)